The British Rail Class 60 is a class of Co-Co heavy freight diesel-electric locomotives built by Brush Traction. They are nicknamed Tugs by rail enthusiasts.

During the 1980s, it became increasingly apparent that British Rail required a more capable Type 5 locomotive for its heavy freight trains. Dissatisfaction with the British Rail Class 56's reliability led to the stipulation of a 95 percent availability, a stringent requirement at the time. A total of three bids were received to a competitive tender issued on 10 August 1987; of these, Brush Traction's submission was selected and an order for 100 locomotives was issued during the following year. Despite the first example being completed during June 1989, due to a number of technical issues discovered during testing, the first examples of the Class 60 would not enter revenue service until late 1990.

Operated only during the final years of British Rail, the entire Class 60 fleet became the property of English Welsh & Scottish (EWS) following the privatisation of British Rail during the mid-1990s. While the company was reportedly unimpressed by the type's performance, it was retained for heavy freight duties while much of the fleet was stored and subsequently sold on to other operators. Between 2004 and 2007, typically between 50 and 75% of the fleet would be out of action at a given time. However, during November 2010, EWS's successor, DB Schenker, announced that a portion of the fleet would be overhauled, referring to such units as Super 60s and extending their service life through to around 2025. Not all Class 60s received such overhauls however. During 2020, a Class 60 became the first example of the type to be scrapped, while another became the first to be preserved.

History
During the early 1980s, British Rail operated several different diesel locomotives that had been categorised as Type 5, these being a relatively high-powered locomotive suited to heavy freight trains, such as the Class 56 and Class 58. However, the Class 56 proved to be somewhat unreliable, contributing to dissatisfaction amongst British Rail's customer base. One such customer, Foster Yeoman, became so disillusioned with the locomotives supplied for its aggregates trains that it procured its own private fleet of Class 59 locomotives from General Motors Electro-Motive Division in the United States. British Rail was reportedly interested in acquiring its own fleet of Class 59 locomotives, but hesitated in fear of objections by trade unions that such an order would not support British manufacturers. To avoid causing tension, BR decided that it should continue to support domestic suppliers when making new orders.

These various factors drove British Rail to produce a stringent requirement calling for a new Type 5 diesel locomotive for use on its Trainload Freight sector. In terms of its basic configuration, it sought a high-powered low-speed locomotive suitable for its existing core traffic operations. Furthermore, this requirement stipulated that the tentative locomotive would be required to maintain an average availability of no less than 95 percent, which was far higher than any locomotive to have been operated by British Rail at that time. It was believed that the high performance levels demanded would generate considerable cost reductions, as well as significantly bolstering efforts within British Rail's rail freight division to meet targets set out by the British government. It was forecast that 100 of these new locomotives could replace 236 older ones of various types, including classes 20, 33, and 47, many of which would be withdrawn or cascaded onto other duties.

Despite having discounted a direct purchase of the Class 59, during the research phase, some of the concepts for the Class 60 were reportedly modelled upon its design. Inspiration was also drawn from the French rail freight industry. Roughly a dozen designs were studied, based upon staff feedback and market research; a total of three were carried through to the advanced stages of study, during which mock-ups were produced. A late-stage decision to reduce the size of the engine compartment enabled the redesign of the cabs at either end of the locomotive.

On 10 August 1987, the British Railways Board issued a competitive tender for response by 7 November, for a fleet of 100 locomotives. A total of six companies were invited to tender, these being Brush Electrical Machines, GEC Transportation, General Motors, General Electric, Metro-Cammell and NEI Consortium. Of these, only three companies chose to respond with a bid by the November 1987 deadline:
 Metro-Cammell – offered a Metro-Cammell body with an option of traction packages, many untried, and could not offer performance guarantees as stipulated by the tender
 General Electric Company – a partnership with General Motors Electro Motive. They offered a state-of-the-art Class 59, built in the UK, probably at Crewe Works, which had an existing partnership for construction of the Class 91 electric locos
 Brush Traction – offered a locomotive powered by either a Mirrlees or Ruston engine, and used separately excited (Sepex) traction control, as previously tested on the Class 58.

Of the three bidders, Brush's submission was selected as the winner. On 17 May 1988, the placement of an order for 100 locomotives with Brush valued at £120 million was announced by Paul Channon, the Secretary of State for Transport. Production of the type commenced quickly thereafter. Brush decided to subcontract much of the component manufacturing work, while performing final assembly of each locomotive at its erecting shops at Loughborough. The bodyshell of the Class 60, which was shared with the Class 92 electric locomotives, was fabricated by Procor (UK) of Wakefield. The engine was a higher-powered development of the Mirrlees engine, which had been previously fitted experimentally to Class 37 nos. 37 901-37 904.

On 1 July 1989, less than 14 months following the order's announcement, the first locomotive departed Brush, having been formally handed over to British Rail in a ceremony held the day beforehand. It was initially dispatched to the Engineering Development Unit at Derby where it underwent testing, revealing the type to possess a number of teething problems. Specific areas that required redesign work included the control software, suspension system, and structural elements; reportedly, there were in excess of 100 individual faults ultimately identified, resulting in a threat of the order's cancellation being issued unless the outstanding problems were rectified. It would take two years before 60 001, the first member of the class, would be available for traffic. As a consequence of needing to make modifications, none of the Class 60s were used operationally until the following year.

During late 1990, British Rail accepted the first pair of locomotives into revenue service. Initially, the Class 60s were divided amongst several sectors of British Rail; 42 locomotives were assigned to coal traffic, while 13 were tasked with construction trains, along with 17 locomotives for moving metal trains and a further 17 for petroleum movements. A further seven were used during the construction of the Channel Tunnel, before being reassigned to general construction duties. During March 1993, the final locomotive of the class was accepted into traffic.

Design

Bodywork
Unlike the Classes 59 and 66 (solid girder underframe) the Class 60s have a monocoque stressed skin construction with diagonal trusses – with the external bodywork providing support for the internal components.

Two different cab designs were considered and full size mock-ups were made in wood, plastic and metal by the Engineering Development Unit at the Railway Technical Centre in Derby. One of these had a French-style raked-forward cab end, similar to the SNCF Class CC 72000, but this was rejected in favour of a more conventional cab.

Electrical
The main alternator is a Brush BA1006A type, providing power for the traction motors via rectification circuits to DC. The auxiliary alternator is Brush BAA 702A Auxiliary Alternator, providing power for the radiator fans, lubrication and fuel oil pumps, traction motor cooling fans and air compressors amongst others. The main and auxiliary alternators are both driven by the main engine.

Each of the six axles is driven via a reduction gear by one nose suspended axle hung traction motor (Brush designed and built TM2161A four pole motors). Each motor has a separate microprocessor-controlled power supply (SEPEX in Brush's designation – from "Separately Excited"), a system that was first tried on one Class 58, 58050. One feature of this system is that if one set of wheels/axle/motor starts to wheelslip their speed can be reduced without affecting the other motors.

Prime mover
The engine is an 8-cylinder, 145 litre Mirrlees Blackstone 8MB275T four-stroke diesel traction engine (275 mm cylinder diameter); the Mirrlees engine was one of the most fuel efficient available at the time (189g of fuel per kWhr), but relatively heavy. The engine was also successfully installed in marine applications such as small ships and passenger ferries. The low cylinder count for the rated power was expected to result in lower maintenance costs.

Engine dimensions
 Eight cylinders in line
 Bore, 275 mm (10.8 inch)
 Stroke, 305 mm (12 inch)
 Power output, 3,100 hp (2,311 kW) at 1,000 rpm

Current operators

DB Cargo UK

Following the privatisation of British Rail, all 100 units came under the management of the English Welsh & Scottish (EWS). Reportedly, the company was not impressed by the Class 60's performance, having a generally disfavourable attitude towards all of British Rail's locomotives. Thus, EWS decided not to reduce the 100 strong fleet, even those units that were damaged by fires and collisions would receive repairs. During most of 2003 and 2004, a portion of the fleet entered storage, having been deemed to be surplus to requirements. It was in 2004 that the first locomotive of the class was reportedly withdrawn, being retained by the company and gradually stripped for parts.

Between 2004 and 2007, typically between 50% and 75% of the fleet would be out of action at a given time. During 2007, the operational fleet was estimated to be 60 locomotives. While members of the fleet were reaching the milestone of 20,000 operating hours, at which point an overhaul was required, no authorisation for this work was given, with individual locomotives being rotated instead. This allegedly led to operational numbers dropping as low as four locomotives. According to Rail Magazine, there were suspicions that the whole class was close to being permanently withdrawn around this time, although the Class 60 was noted to have superior performance to the newer British Rail Class 66 when hauling particularly heavy freight trains.

In June 2007, EWS was acquired by DB Schenker, a wholly owned subsidiary of the German railway company, Deutsche Bahn. During September 2010, twenty of the class were offered for disposal by DB Schenker UK. Many of the locomotives marked for disposal had sustained catastrophic failures or were otherwise in a poor condition.

During November 2010, DBS announced that a batch of 20 units would receive overhauls. According to Rail Magazine, rumours that the company was interested in replacing the Class 60's engines were prevalent around this time. In January 2011, DB Schenker announced that seven units would undergo overhauls, along with an option to overhaul a further fourteen members of the class; this work reportedly extended the fleet's operational life by 15 years. During January 2013, the overhaul programme was described as an "upgrade" to create a new fleet of "Super 60's". This programme involved the complete overhaul, but not total replacement, of the locomotive's engine, as well as the refurbishment of various elements, including the traction motors, bogies, control gear, cabs, and electrical systems.

The overhaul work was performed primarily at the Toton Traction Maintenance Depot, DB Schenker's principal maintenance base in Britain. Locomotives which had gone through the Super 60 program by September 2013 included (17); 60 007, 010, 015, 017, 019, 020, 024, 039, 040, 054, 059, 062, 063, 074, 079, 091, 092, with another four programmed later that year; 60 001, 044, 066 and 60 100, although its unclear if all of these were completed. Those Class 60s that had been decommissioned were not anticipated to ever be overhauled.

In 2012, a number of some Class 60s were offered for sale through Romic-Ace International Pte Ltd. During the following year, DB Schenker Rail UK offered 20 locomotives for sale. These were to be purchased on 31 October 2013 by Doncaster-based Wabtec Rail in a £10 million deal – the deal was reported to have fallen through in 2014.

In August 2017, DB Cargo UK offered a further 20 locomotives for sale, these being 60 003, 004, 005, 006, 008, 013, 014, 018, 022, 023, 025, 027, 030, 031, 032, 037, 042, 050, 051, and 052. They were sold to Wabtec Rail. However again this sale subsequently fell through. In late 2018, DB Cargo UK offered 3 Class 60's (60 004, 014 and 018) for sale, which caused the status of the previous sale of Class 60 locomotives to Wabtec to be uncertain, given all 3 locomotives had thought to have been included in the previous Wabtec sale. During December 2018, DB Cargo UK offered further Class 60s for sale – 60 008, 028, 029, 046, 055, 064, 070 and 098, which was the first time 60 064 had been put up for sale.

In 2019, DB Cargo UK offered 60 006, 050, 060, 081 and 086 for sale, stored at Toton. All found buyers with three, initially, sold to metal recyclers (60 006 & 086 sold to Ron Hull, Rotherham, 60 050 to Raxstar) and 60 060 & 081 to 'Private Sales'. Subsequently, 60 086 was resold to a private owner and 60 050 was purchased by the same individual.

On 20 January 2020 60 006 was scrapped at Toton, it is reportedly the first of the class to be scrapped. On 10 February 2020, 60 086 was transferred to the Wensleydale Railway and into preservation. This was followed by 60 050.

GB Railfreight
In July 2018, GB Railfreight bought all ten of Colas Rail's Class 60 locomotives, Colas having replaced them with a further seven orders for Class 70 locomotives.

DCRail
In March 2019 DCRail acquired four locomotives from DB Cargo; 60 028, 029, 046, 055. These have been overhauled by DB Cargo at Toton TMD with 60 046 the first to enter service in November 2019.

Former operators

British Rail

By the end of 1990, 12 members of the class had been introduced to revenue service. The first locomotives to be accepted into traffic were 60 017 and 60 018 in October 1990. The class 60s primarily worked on aggregate (specifically stone) traffic also replacing Class 56s and Class 58s, some of which were withdrawn, others transferred. Their introduction replaced double-heading and also allowed longer and/or heavier trains to be worked. The type enabled the replacement of previously double-headed Class 33 Type 3s in the South East region, as well as Classes 20, 26, 27, 31 and 73. The relatively youthful Class 58 fleet were also cascaded from the coal traffic they had been the staple of. During March 1993, the final locomotive of the class was accepted into traffic.

In preparation for the privatisation of British Rail, the organisation's freight business was divided into five separate units; of these, three would operate the Class 60. Mainline were assigned 52 of the type, while Loadhaul and Transrail received 31 and 17 Class 60s respectively. These entities only briefly existed before their purchase by English Welsh & Scottish (EWS), thus transferring all members of the Class to a single private sector operator.

Colas Rail

In June 2014, it was reported that 10 locomotives had been sold to Colas Rail. The numbers are 60 002/021/026/047/056/076/085/087/095/096. The first one to appear in the Colas yellow and orange livery was 60 087, which was photographed at Burton-on-Trent on 2 June 2014. In July 2018, Colas Rail sold all ten of its locomotives to GB Railfreight.

Accidents and incidents
 On 26 August 2020, 60 062 Stainless Pioneer was hauling a tanker train that derailed and caught fire at Morlais Junction, near , Carmarthenshire.

Naming and liveries

In 1989 Railfreight named the Class 60s in traditional fashion; those locomotives attached to the construction and metals sectors were named after British mountains as were some attached to the coal sector. The others (coal and petroleum sectors) received the names of famous British citizens, with an emphasis on those whose contribution had been to science and engineering. Locomotives numbered 60 001 and 60 098 were exceptions, being named Steadfast and Charles Francis Brush respectively. The locomotives received the standard liveries of their respective sectors.

After coming into EWS's ownership, the Class 60 locomotives were repainted in the red and yellow EWS livery as and when repainting was necessary. Many others carried vinyl stickers on their sides over the former BR sector liveries, demonstrating EWS's ownership. A few locos received new names including 60 033: Tees Steel Express, painted in British Steel blue, and 60 081, repainted in a mock Great Western Railway green livery and renamed Isambard Kingdom Brunel in 2000.

In 2007/08, two locomotives received special liveries: 60 074 received a 'powder blue' livery and was named Teenage Spirit at the National Railway Museum in York as part of a charity event for the Teenage Cancer Trust. 60 040 was repainted in a red livery and named The Territorial Army Centenary as part of the celebration of that event. Both of these locos have since been repainted into standard DB Schenker livery.

In 2010 class 60 number 60 099 was repainted into a Tata Steel silver livery and logo at Toton TMD and unveiled at Tata's Scunthorpe plant on 27 September.

In January 2011 60 011 became the first member of the class to receive the standard DB Schenker livery, after a repaint at Toton TMD.

In late May 2014 60 087 emerged from Toton TMD in Colas livery. It was joined by 60 002, 021, 026, 047, 056, 076, 085, 095 and 096.

In 2019 DCR Cappagh acquired four former DB Cargo Class 60s, from store, which were overhauled and repainted by DB Cargo at Toton TMD. 60 046 and 60 055 were repainted in the DC Rail Freight corporate grey livery. 60 046 regained its original name, William Wilberforce, whilst 60 055 regained its original name, Thomas Barnardo. 60 028 was turned out in a blue livery, with large CAPPAGH logo. On 18 February 2020 the final locomotive of the quartet, 60 029, emerged from a repaint, at Toton TMD, in DC Rail Freight grey and carrying its original name, Ben Nevis.

Scrapping

On 20 January 2020 work began scrapping locomotive 60 006 at Toton depot, the first Class 60 to be dismantled.

Fleet summary
Fleet summary 2020.

Class list

Preservation
Presently three members of the class have been preserved.

Models
The locomotives have been reproduced in scale model form by Heljan in O scale, Lima and Hornby in OO scale and Graham Farish in British N scale.

Notes

References

Sources

Further reading

External links

Class 60 page at Brush Traction website www.brushtraction.com
 www.therailwaycentre.com
The Class 60 Preservation Group 
Class 60 profile at trainspo.com
Class 60 page at Dave Coxon's website www.traintesting.com

60
Co-Co locomotives
Brush Traction locomotives
Railway locomotives introduced in 1989
Standard gauge locomotives of Great Britain
Diesel-electric locomotives of Great Britain